

Spring

Fall

Overview
This tournament was exact replica of the spring championship by the format of the competition, including the nomination of points.

League standings

See also
 Soviet Second League
 Soviet First League 1936
 1936 Soviet Top League

External links
  Final tables of spring 1936

1936
3
Soviet
Soviet